Sect (stylised in all caps) is the debut studio album by Australian electronic producer Golden Features, released on 27 July 2018 via Warner Music Australia. The album was supported by a headline national tour across Australia commencing on Saturday 11 August 2018 until Saturday 26 August 2018. The tour was announced on 4 April 2018 alongside the album, following the release of lead single “Falling Out” on 22 March 2018.

Sect reached number one on the ARIA Dance Albums Chart on 6 August 2018 and peaked at number 11 on the Aria Albums Chart.

"Woodcut" (featuring Romrarin) was later released as a single, accompanied by two remixes of the album track on 14 December 2018.

Background 
Thomas George Stell, known professionally as Golden Features, released his first eponymously titled four-track EP Golden Features was on 28 March 2014 with the single "Tell Me" featuring Nicole Millar. This was followed by a second four-track EP XXIV, released on 19 June 2015 with lead single "No One" which peaked at number 58 on the ARIA Singles Chart and was listed at number 92 on the Triple J Hottest 100, 2015. On 29 November 2016, he released a single "Wolfie" (featuring Julia Stone) which reached number 70 in Triple J Hottest 100, 2016.

His debut album Sect arrived two years later on 27 July 2018 via Warner Music Australia. Previous releases such as "Tell Me", "No One" and "Wolfie" had demonstrated his production and songwriting, for which Stell gained attention and has been said to have "amassed a strong legion of fans". During the process of creating Sect, Stell favoured the feel of hardware for the album, stating, "I abandoned a lot of software in favour of hardware as an attempt to limit sound design possibilities, and more importantly I settled on an ethos for the entire record. It's simple. Underneath all of the production flex, does the song stand on its own?"

The Sydney producer took a different approach to the record, stating on Triple J on 27 July 2018 that he had "always felt that an album needs to be a solid body of work and not just a collection of tracks that you've kind of thrown together". He continued by describing his vision for the record, "It was just more writing things with a common goal in mind and a common sound and not repeating myself" and "you gotta cherry pick a lot more which is a tedious process".

Sect has been called a "collaborative affair" rather than a "solitary creation". Stell has credited the help of both Harrison Mills of Odesza and Kim Moyes of the Presets in creating Sect: "I love [Harrison] because we can just critique the shit out of each other and there's no ego there. It's really natural." Stell continued, "I really like Harrison, I trust him, it felt more normal him helping than if it was a stranger pitching it."

Promotion

Singles 
The album was preceded by lead single "Falling Out" on 22 March 2018. Sect was announced alongside a national headline tour on 4 April 2018. On 12 June 2018, "Worship" was released as a single, followed by "Always" on 13 July 2018 before the album's release on 27 July 2018.

"Woodcut", featuring Romarin, was later released as a single accompanied by two remixes of the album track on 14 December 2018.

Music videos 
A music video for lead single "Falling Out" was released on 10 May 2018, directed and produced by Free the Wolves.

Commercial performance 
Sect peaked at number 11 on the ARIA Albums Chart and reached number one on the ARIA Dance Albums Chart on 6 August 2018.

Reception 
Sect has generally received critical acclaim from reviewers, with praise towards Golden Features' evolution of his signature sound. The release of the album was highly anticipated, according to EDMTunes editor F. Wilde, and takes an "innovative approach" on tracks like "Medicate" and exposes "creative agency" and "contrast[ing] sharp and soft textures" in tracks like "Woodcut" and "Worship". With the release of the album, Golden Features has been called "one of Australia’s most compelling electronic acts". Sect crosses genre boundaries "[f]rom the melodic tones of house, to the pop structures of indie electro" and Stell has "reinvented these influences into a distinct sound that is all his own". Grant Gilmore of EDM Identity similarly commented on the album as an "electro-fueled journey" "blurring the line of indie and electronic".

J. Phillips similarly called Sect "much-anticipated" and upon release was a "hit with fans".

The 10-track album sees Golden Features "weav[ing] between an eclectic mix of driving beats, dark choruses, blistering drops and ethereal vocals". Upon featuring the album, Triple J further notes that singles "Falling Out" and "Worship" "prove Golden Features can move effortlessly between conventional club music and more traditional songwriting".

Apple Music's editorial comments on the overall tone of Sect and notes its Ed Banger influences: "Themes of disorientation and intoxication are unshielded: 'Medicate, separate' and 'I'm high, all day, all night, always', for instance, are repeated as hypnotic mantras over thumping beats, like the soundtrack of a sweaty, strobe-light rave that picks up where Ed Banger Records' mid-2000s heyday left off."

The Golden Features project has a "quality over quantity element" which has culminated with Sect, according to Pilerats editor, which is "drenched in care and attention to detail". Chris Salce of Acid Stag praises the production of Sect as a body of work — "a truly remarkable meeting of dark and deep house worlds that solidifies the signature sound we've all come to know". He continues, "Always" "showcases the trademark heavy electronica of Golden Features" and "Falling Out" is a "clear standout" with "contagious melodies".

Stell is heavily self-critical, stating "I'm such a hard critic on myself [...] I was gearing up for people to not enjoy [the album], because I'd been working on it for so long I just lost scope of what it sounded like. Then the first single got a mixed response..."

Rudi K of Sputnik Music critiques the Australian electronic dance music scene and the place of the album within it. He states that Sect "won't do anything to dissuade critics of the cliché that Australia is perpetually one step and vast oceans behind everyone else when it comes to breaking new ground", continuing with "Golden Features isn't reinventing the wheel site yet, but there are worse artists to draw inspiration from. For now, Sect introduces a distinctive enough sound to make the future enticingly dark". Rudi K gave the album a score of 4.0.

Track listing

Influences 
Golden Features has recognised a wide variety of influences and inspiration in creating his debut album Sect. Stell takes inspiration from "all over the musical spectrum", but has noted being influenced by Ed Banger and the Presets.This album was written around the concept that exclusion forces outliers together in a most beautiful way. Musically my influences are extremely varied. Everything from post-punk and to QOTSA and AIR. Production wise my love for early Ed Banger is worn on my sleeve. I keep reaching back to that 2007 era when producers weren't all crabs in a bucket, fighting to counterfeit the latest hit.During an interview on Triple J following the album receiving a spot as a feature album in the week leading to its release, Stell stated he wanted the tone of the album to be "much darker, much bigger, very operatic". Stell was inspired by his time exploring some of the French artwork on display in the Louvre: "I was really inspired by spending a bit of time in Paris. French art and how just kind of exuberant and expressive it all is, like they really don't pull punches or go for minimalism".

2018 Australian tour 
Following the release of the lead single "Falling Out", Golden Features announced a headline national tour to accompany his debut album on 4 April 2018. Tickets for the tour were slated to go on sale at 10am Friday 6 April and the tour was to kick off in Golden Features' hometown of Sydney at Hordern Pavilion on Saturday 11 August 2018. Golden Features would be accompanied by Big Wild and Nyxen. The show was sold out at Hordern Pavilion in Sydney and The Forum in Melbourne and a second show was added for the latter scheduled for the following day.

Prior to the album's release, Stell's time away from live performances, which has been called "self-imposed creative isolation". was said to have been to "realign his approach to his own music".

Stell had previously commented on his perspective towards touring the Golden Features project when his music began to gain recognition. In an interview with THUMP staff for Vice on 9 April 2014, following the release of "Tell Me", the lead single of his first self-titled EP Golden Features, Stell commented:As of yet there have been no shows. We've got a couple in the works, but I don't want to play the whole DJ thing, and go out and play a bunch of other people's tunes. With that, you find yourself eventually becoming a person to fill a spot. You're playing the same songs as everybody else because you know they'll get a reaction. The whole idea of the Golden Features project is to turn myself into an artist that people actually go to see for their own music.The release of the studio album and headline tour saw Golden Features embracing a different approach for the tour; Troy Mutton of Pilerats comments that that tour saw Stell "moving away from DJing, leaning further into not only just his own music and edits, but playing live and building tracks as well". With regards to the 2018 tour, Stell stated, "I've switched everything over from a DJ set to everything being played piece by piece, each song is split up into 8-12 tracks, and all of them are getting edited and mixed live. There's synths on stage, and things that were otherwise done in the studio will be coming out live."

Shows and tour dates 
Golden Features went on tour across Australia during August 2018 and visited the following cities.

Merchandise 
During promotion of the tour, merchandise was made available through the Golden Features website. The merchandise was distributed by SoundMerch. This included various shirts and hoodies featuring the show list for the Australian 2018 tour and a vinyl and CD of the album featuring the album art.

References 

2018 albums
Electronic dance music albums by Australian artists